Gerhard Stolle (born 11 November 1952) is a retired East German middle distance runner who specialized in the 800 metres. His personal best time was 1.46.19 minutes, achieved at the European Championships in Rome.

Achievements

1952 births
Living people
East German male middle-distance runners